Fominsky (masculine), Fominskaya (feminine), or Fominskoye (neuter) is the name of several rural localities in Russia.

Modern localities

Altai Krai
As of 2012, one rural locality in Altai Krai bears this name:
Fominskoye, Altai Krai (or Fominskaya), a selo under the administrative jurisdiction of the city of krai significance of Biysk;

Arkhangelsk Oblast
As of 2012, seventeen rural localities in Arkhangelsk Oblast bear this name:
Fominsky, Konoshsky District, Arkhangelsk Oblast, a settlement in Vokhtomsky Selsoviet of Konoshsky District
Fominsky, Vilegodsky District, Arkhangelsk Oblast, a settlement in Selyansky Selsoviet of Vilegodsky District
Fominskaya, Kargopolsky District, Arkhangelsk Oblast, a village in Pechnikovsky Selsoviet of Kargopolsky District
Fominskaya, Konoshsky District, Arkhangelsk Oblast, a village in Vokhtomsky Selsoviet of Konoshsky District
Fominskaya, Belosludsky Selsoviet, Krasnoborsky District, Arkhangelsk Oblast, a village in Belosludsky Selsoviet of Krasnoborsky District
Fominskaya, Cherevkovsky Selsoviet, Krasnoborsky District, Arkhangelsk Oblast, a village in Cherevkovsky Selsoviet of Krasnoborsky District
Fominskaya, Lyakhovsky Selsoviet, Krasnoborsky District, Arkhangelsk Oblast, a village in Lyakhovsky Selsoviet of Krasnoborsky District
Fominskaya, Permogorsky Selsoviet, Krasnoborsky District, Arkhangelsk Oblast, a village in Permogorsky Selsoviet of Krasnoborsky District
Fominskaya, Kozminsky Selsoviet, Lensky District, Arkhangelsk Oblast, a village in Kozminsky Selsoviet of Lensky District
Fominskaya, Slobodchikovsky Selsoviet, Lensky District, Arkhangelsk Oblast, a village in Slobodchikovsky Selsoviet of Lensky District
Fominskaya, Rovdinsky Selsoviet, Shenkursky District, Arkhangelsk Oblast, a village in Rovdinsky Selsoviet of Shenkursky District
Fominskaya, Tarnyansky Selsoviet, Shenkursky District, Arkhangelsk Oblast, a village in Tarnyansky Selsoviet of Shenkursky District
Fominskaya, Velsky District, Arkhangelsk Oblast, a village in Lipovsky Selsoviet of Velsky District
Fominskaya, Novovershinsky Selsoviet, Verkhnetoyemsky District, Arkhangelsk Oblast, a village in Novovershinsky Selsoviet of Verkhnetoyemsky District
Fominskaya, Timoshinsky Selsoviet, Verkhnetoyemsky District, Arkhangelsk Oblast, a village in Timoshinsky Selsoviet of Verkhnetoyemsky District
Fominskaya, Ilyinsky Selsoviet, Vilegodsky District, Arkhangelsk Oblast, a village in Ilyinsky Selsoviet of Vilegodsky District
Fominskaya, Selyansky Selsoviet, Vilegodsky District, Arkhangelsk Oblast, a village in Selyansky Selsoviet of Vilegodsky District

Chelyabinsk Oblast
As of 2012, one rural locality in Chelyabinsk Oblast bears this name:
Fominsky, Chelyabinsk Oblast, a settlement in Uysky Selsoviet of Uysky District

Ivanovo Oblast
As of 2012, four rural localities in Ivanovo Oblast bear this name:
Fominskoye (selo), Furmanovsky District, Ivanovo Oblast, a selo in Furmanovsky District
Fominskoye (village), Furmanovsky District, Ivanovo Oblast, a village in Furmanovsky District
Fominskoye, Kineshemsky District, Ivanovo Oblast, a village in Kineshemsky District
Fominskoye, Zavolzhsky District, Ivanovo Oblast, a village in Zavolzhsky District

Republic of Karelia
As of 2012, one rural locality in the Republic of Karelia bears this name:
Fominskaya, Republic of Karelia, a village in Medvezhyegorsky District

Kostroma Oblast
As of 2012, four rural localities in Kostroma Oblast bear this name:
Fominskoye, Buysky District, Kostroma Oblast, a village in Tsentralnoye Settlement of Buysky District; 
Fominskoye, Galichsky District, Kostroma Oblast, a village in Dmitriyevskoye Settlement of Galichsky District; 
Fominskoye, Kostromskoy District, Kostroma Oblast, a selo in Sandogorskoye Settlement of Kostromskoy District; 
Fominskoye, Susaninsky District, Kostroma Oblast, a village in Sumarokovskoye Settlement of Susaninsky District;

Moscow
As of 2012, one rural locality in Moscow bears this name:
Fominskoye, Moscow, a village in Pervomayskoye Settlement of Troitsky Administrative Okrug in the federal city of Moscow

Moscow Oblast
As of 2012, four rural localities in Moscow Oblast bear this name:
Fominskoye, Mytishchinsky District, Moscow Oblast, a village in Fedoskinskoye Rural Settlement of Mytishchinsky District
Fominskoye, Ramensky District, Moscow Oblast, a village in Ulyaninskoye Rural Settlement of Ramensky District
Fominskoye, Solnechnogorsky District, Moscow Oblast, a village in Smirnovskoye Rural Settlement of Solnechnogorsky District
Fominskoye, Taldomsky District, Moscow Oblast, a village in Yermolinskoye Rural Settlement of Taldomsky District

Nizhny Novgorod Oblast
As of 2012, one rural locality in Nizhny Novgorod Oblast bears this name:
Fominskoye, Nizhny Novgorod Oblast, a village in Bolshearyevsky Selsoviet of Urensky District

Smolensk Oblast
As of 2012, one rural locality in Smolensk Oblast bears this name:
Fominskoye, Smolensk Oblast, a village in Mytishinskoye Rural Settlement of Ugransky District

Sverdlovsk Oblast
As of 2012, two rural localities in Sverdlovsk Oblast bear this name:
Fominskoye, Alapayevsky District, Sverdlovsk Oblast, a selo in Alapayevsky District
Fominskoye, Tugulymsky District, Sverdlovsk Oblast, a selo in Tugulymsky District

Tver Oblast
As of 2012, two rural localities in Tver Oblast bear this name:
Fominskoye, Sonkovsky District, Tver Oblast, a village in Koyskoye Rural Settlement of Sonkovsky District
Fominskoye, Udomelsky District, Tver Oblast, a village in Kotlovanskoye Rural Settlement of Udomelsky District

Volgograd Oblast
As of 2012, one rural locality in Volgograd Oblast bears this name:
Fominsky, Volgograd Oblast, a khutor under the administrative jurisdiction of Novonikolayevsky Urban-Type Settlement in Novonikolayevsky District

Vologda Oblast
As of 2012, twelve rural localities in Vologda Oblast bear this name:
Fominsky, Vologda Oblast, a pochinok in Kurilovsky Selsoviet of Kichmengsko-Gorodetsky District
Fominskoye, Cherepovetsky District, Vologda Oblast, a village in Shalimovsky Selsoviet of Cherepovetsky District
Fominskoye, Kharovsky District, Vologda Oblast, a village in Kharovsky Selsoviet of Kharovsky District
Fominskoye, Fominsky Selsoviet, Sheksninsky District, Vologda Oblast, a village in Fominsky Selsoviet of Sheksninsky District
Fominskoye, Yeremeyevsky Selsoviet, Sheksninsky District, Vologda Oblast, a village in Yeremeyevsky Selsoviet of Sheksninsky District
Fominskoye, Totemsky District, Vologda Oblast, a village in Pogorelovsky Selsoviet of Totemsky District
Fominskaya, Babayevsky District, Vologda Oblast, a village in Komonevsky Selsoviet of Babayevsky District
Fominskaya, Totemsky District, Vologda Oblast, a village in Moseyevsky Selsoviet of Totemsky District
Fominskaya, Velikoustyugsky District, Vologda Oblast, a village in Nizhneshardengsky Selsoviet of Velikoustyugsky District
Fominskaya, Kolengsky Selsoviet, Verkhovazhsky District, Vologda Oblast, a village in Kolengsky Selsoviet of Verkhovazhsky District
Fominskaya, Morozovsky Selsoviet, Verkhovazhsky District, Vologda Oblast, a village in Morozovsky Selsoviet of Verkhovazhsky District
Fominskaya, Vozhegodsky District, Vologda Oblast, a village in Maryinsky Selsoviet of Vozhegodsky District

Yaroslavl Oblast
As of 2012, ten rural localities in Yaroslavl Oblast bear this name:
Fominskoye, Bolsheselsky District, Yaroslavl Oblast, a village in Chudinovsky Rural Okrug of Bolsheselsky District
Fominskoye, Borisoglebsky District, Yaroslavl Oblast, a village in Krasnooktyabrsky Rural Okrug of Borisoglebsky District
Fominskoye, Vakhtinsky Rural Okrug, Danilovsky District, Yaroslavl Oblast, a village in Vakhtinsky Rural Okrug of Danilovsky District
Fominskoye, Zimenkovsky Rural Okrug, Danilovsky District, Yaroslavl Oblast, a village in Zimenkovsky Rural Okrug of Danilovsky District
Fominskoye, Kholmovsky Rural Okrug, Poshekhonsky District, Yaroslavl Oblast, a village in Kholmovsky Rural Okrug of Poshekhonsky District
Fominskoye, Kolodinsky Rural Okrug, Poshekhonsky District, Yaroslavl Oblast, a village in Kolodinsky Rural Okrug of Poshekhonsky District
Fominskoye, Nazarovsky Rural Okrug, Rybinsky District, Yaroslavl Oblast, a village in Nazarovsky Rural Okrug of Rybinsky District
Fominskoye, Volzhsky Rural Okrug, Rybinsky District, Yaroslavl Oblast, a village in Volzhsky Rural Okrug of Rybinsky District
Fominskoye, Tutayevsky District, Yaroslavl Oblast, a settlement in Fominsky Rural Okrug of Tutayevsky District
Fominskoye, Uglichsky District, Yaroslavl Oblast, a village in Otradnovsky Rural Okrug of Uglichsky District

Abolished localities
Fominskoye, Parfenyevsky District, Kostroma Oblast, a village in Anosovsky Selsoviet of Parfenyevsky District in Kostroma Oblast; abolished on October 18, 2004

References

Notes

Sources